Cybertechnology is a supplement published by FASA in 1995 for the dystopian near-future cyberpunk role-playing game Shadowrun.

Contents
Cybertechnology by Tom Dowd, Carl Sargent, Diane Piron-Gelman, and Michael Mulvihill, details new high-tech cyberware weaponry that can be implanted into Shadowrun characters. The book also covers the revolutionary technique known as Cybermancy.

Reception
In the December 1995 edition of Arcane (Issue 1), Andy Butcher was ambivalent about the book, saying, "Cybertechnology isn't a bad book – it's well written, and provides potentially useful insights and information about cyberware in Shadowrun. Anyone looking for the equivalent of Cyberpunk 2020'''s Chromebooks, though, will be disappointed."

In the February 1996 edition of Dragon (Issue 226), Rick Swan thought that "Cybertechnology wastes a lot of space on lame commentary" and believed it was not as good a value as the similarly themed Hardware/Software supplement written for Shatterzone''.

References

Role-playing game supplements introduced in 1995
Shadowrun supplements